Tammy was a weekly British comic for girls published by Fleetway in London from 1971 to 1984. Tammy was closely linked editorially with the fellow Fleetway titles Misty and Jinty (eventually absorbing both of them). At its height, Tammy sold 250,000 copies per week, more than popular IPC Magazines titles like 2000 AD.

Tammy's first editor was Gerry Finley-Day, followed by Wilf Prigmore.

Publication history 
Tammy published 689 issues from 6 February 1971 to 23 June 1984, at which point it merged with Girl volume 2. Other titles which had merged with Tammy before then include Sally, June, Sandie, Jinty, Misty, and Princess (vol. 2).

As well as the weekly comic, Christmas annuals were also published.

Content 
Every Tammy issue was a collection of stories, usually serial instalments, that lasted three or four pages. While there were similarities with its Fleetway stablemates Jinty and Misty, each comic magazine had its own focus, with Tammy being known for its bleak variations of Cinderella. Commenting on serial Slaves of Orphan War Farm, Julia Round says that the story is emblematic of Tammy's themes: "a working class heroine, constantly thwarted hope, and overt violence against girls, usually from an older authority figure." Tammy sub-editor Pat Mills saw that weekly as being different from "nice", "middle-class" British girl's comics, like Diana and Princess Tina, that had come before. Many stories were full of cruelty and adversity, based on the understanding that girls wanted stories that made them cry. One serial that stood out to a number of reviewers was The Loneliest Girl in the World, with artwork by Jaume Rumeu.

Tammy's respective merges with Misty brought darker, horror tones, and the merge with Jinty brought more science-fiction. Despite these, changes in editorship brought Tammy to a more traditional mold in storytelling during the 1980s. The dark, cruel streaks that made Tammy so revolutionary in the 1970s had disappeared, except for Bella Barlow.

Tammy had more long-running regulars than most girls' comics due to the comic's respective merges. The Tammy and Sandie merger brought Wee Sue and Jeannie and her Uncle "Meanie" in 1973. The Tammy and June merger brought Bessie Bunter, Mam'selle X, and the Storyteller with The Strangest Stories Ever Told in 1974. The Tammy and Misty merger brought Miss T and Misty herself to join the Storyteller, in 1980. The Tammy and Jinty merger brought Pam of Pond Hill in 1981.

Creators

Attribution
In a move unusual for girls' comics, artists and writers were credited in the pages of Tammy (although only its last few years). (2000 AD, in contrast, had included credits from issue #36, 29 October 1977.)

Artists
Artists featured in the pages of Tammy included John Armstrong, who drew the long-running character Bella Barlow. Others included Mario Capaldi, Jose Casanovas, Tony Coleman, Diane Gabbott, Douglas Perry, Eduardo Feito, Giorgio Giorgetti (Belinda Bookworm; The Cat Girl; Jump, Jump, Julia; Sister in the Shadows; Star Struck Sister; Witch Hazel), Juliana Buch, and Miguel Quesada.

Writers
Writers featured included Jenny McDade, who wrote Star Struck Sister, the first Bella Barlow story and Come Back, Bindi; Benita Brown, who wrote the science fiction story Tomorrow Town; Gerry Finley-Day, who wrote The Camp on Candy Island; Maureen Spurgeon, who wrote the Molly Mills stories;  Pat Mills, who wrote Granny's Town, Thursday's Child and Glenda's Glossy Pages; Malcolm Shaw, who wrote E.T. Estate; Ian Mennell, who wrote Namby Pamby and Cuckoo in the Nest; Alison Christie, who specialised in heart-tugging stories such as A Gran for the Gregorys and Cassie's Coach; Jay Over, who wrote Slave of the Clock and Pam of Pond Hill from the Jinty merger; Primrose Cumming, who wrote the later Bella Barlow stories; and Anne Digby, who wrote Olympia Jones; Terence Magee, who wrote The Four Friends at Spartan School, The Witch of Widecombe Wold and Sally in a Shell.

List of strips and stories 

 Belinda Bookworm (illustrated by Giorgio Giorgetti)
 Bella Barlow (initially written by Jenny McDade, later by Primrose Cumming; illustrated by John Armstrong)
 Bessie Bunter (by Ron Clark and Arthur Martin) — about a pupil of Cliff House School, a fictional girls' school near Greyfriars School. Bessie is essentially a female counterpart to her brother Billy, sharing many characteristics with her brother, including her large size and large appetite. As unappealing as her brother, Bessie is conceited, untruthful, gluttonous and obese, but is rather more domineering than him and usually imposes her will by nagging, or, in the case of her brothers, by administering hefty slaps to the head. Continued from June (from 1974)
 The Camp on Candy Island (written by Gerry Finley-Day)
 Cassie's Coach (written by Alison Christie)
 The Cat Girl (illustrated by Giorgio Giorgetti)
 Come Back, Bindi (written by Jenny McDade)
 Cuckoo in the Nest (written by Ian Mennell)
 E.T. Estate (written by Malcolm Shaw)
 The Four Friends at Spartan School (written by Terence Magee)
 Glenda's Glossy Pages (written by Pat Mills)
 A Gran for the Gregorys (written by Alison Christie)
 Granny's Town (written by Pat Mills)
 Jeannie and her Uncle "Meanie" — continued from Sandie (from 1973)
 Jump, Jump, Julia (illustrated by Giorgio Giorgetti)
 The Loneliest Girl in the World (illustrated by Jaume Rumeu)
 Lucky's Living Doll, later known as Lucky and Tina (illustrated by Robert MacGillivray) — continued from June (from 1974); originally from School Friend 
 Mam'selle X (illustrated by drawn by Giorgio Giorgetti) — actress Avril Claire is not very popular in Occupied France, as she performs for the German troops. But what nobody knows is that she is in fact Mam'selle X, a member of the French Resistance — continued from June (from 1974); originally from School Friend
 Molly Mills (written by Maureen Spurgeon)
 Namby Pamby (written by Ian Mennell)
  Olympia Jones (written by Anne Digby)
 Pam of Pond Hill (written by Jay Over) — Pam Watts brings us stories of what happened when she was a first-year at Pond Hill Comprehensive. These usually deal with bullies, problem pupils, teachers, family and friendship problems, brushes with the law, accidents and catastrophes, school trips, Christmas chaos, and even the occasional hint of the supernatural, all told in Pam's own words and her own language. Continued from Jinty (from 1981)
 Sally in a Shell (written by Terence Magee)
 Sister in the Shadows (illustrated by Giorgio Giorgetti)
 Slave of the Clock (written by Jay Over)
 Slaves of Orphan War Farm — "a working class heroine, constantly thwarted hope, and overt violence against girls, usually from an older authority figure."
 Spartan School (written by Terence Magee)
 Star Struck Sister (by Jenny McDade and Giorgio Giorgetti)
 The Strangest Stories Ever Told (by various writers and artists) — spooky stories told by The Storyteller, a pipe-smoking host (continued from June, from 1974; originally from School Friend); later adding Miss T and Misty (from Misty, from 1980)
  Thursday's Child (written by Pat Mills)
 Tomorrow Town (written by Benita Brown)
 Wee Sue — Sue Strong is the midget of Milltown, but what she lacks in height she more than makes up for in brains and generosity. Sue's brains are regularly called upon when it comes to dodging her grumpy, vain, bullying, slave-driving teacher Miss Bigger and the tons of homework she always dishes out. Continued from Sandie (from 1973)
 Witch Hazel (illustrated by Giorgio Giorgetti)
 The Witch of Widecombe Wold (written by Terence Magee)

See also 
 British girls' comics

Notes

References

Sources

External links
 List of Tammy stories and characters Preceded by an article on Tammy's exploration of Snobbery
 The Tammy Project documents and discusses individual serials

1971 comics debuts
British comics titles
British girls' comics
Weekly magazines published in the United Kingdom
Comics magazines published in the United Kingdom
Comics anthologies
Defunct British comics
Fleetway and IPC Comics titles
Magazines published in London
Magazines established in 1971
Magazines disestablished in 1984